The following is an episode list for the animated television series Teenage Mutant Ninja Turtles which premiered in 1987. In total, 193 episodes aired between 1987 and 1996. The first three seasons were aired in syndication. CBS aired the rest of the series on Saturday mornings.

As of August 14, 2012, all ten seasons are available on DVD in North America from Lionsgate Home Entertainment, the successor to Family Home Entertainment, which released the series' VHS tapes in North America (early Lionsgate DVD releases were co-branded with FHE).

Series overview

Episodes

Season 1 (1987)

Season 2 (1988)

Season 3 (1989)

Season 4 (1990–91)

Season 5 (1991)

Season 6 (1992)

Season 7 (1993)

Season 8 (1994)

Season 9 (1995)

Season 10 (1996)

Specials (1990–2017)

DVD releases
English-language DVD releases of the original Ninja Turtles series are handled by Lions Gate Entertainment. All episodes from seasons 1–10 have been released in North America, including the "Vacation in Europe" sideseason. In the UK, only seasons 1 and 2 have been released in their entirety, alongside several compilation discs. Australia have received the complete seasons 1-4, not including the "Vacation" sideseason. These discs were released in NTSC format, despite PAL being standard for the region. In Germany, KSM Film has released every episode from seasons 1–10, including the "Vacation" sideseason. These releases feature the German audio track, while seasons 1–7 also include the original English audio.

Region 1 (United States of America and Canada)
Teenage Mutant Ninja Turtles – Volume 1 (April 20, 2004) 
Single disc containing all 5 episodes from season 1, plus 4 bonus episodes from season 10.
Teenage Mutant Ninja Turtles – Volume 2 (April 26, 2005) 
Single disc containing all 13 episodes from season 2.
Teenage Mutant Ninja Turtles – Volume 3 (December 6, 2005) 
Single disc containing episodes 1–12 from season 3.
Teenage Mutant Ninja Turtles – Volume 4 (April 4, 2006) 
Single disc containing episodes 13–24 from season 3.
Teenage Mutant Ninja Turtles – Volume 5 (August 29, 2006) 
Single disc containing episodes 25–36 from season 3.
Teenage Mutant Ninja Turtles – Volume 6 (December 5, 2006) 
Single disc containing episodes 37–47 from season 3, plus episode 1 from season 4.
Teenage Mutant Ninja Turtles – Season Four (March 13, 2007) 
5-disc set containing all 39 episodes from season 4, plus episode 1 from season 5.
Teenage Mutant Ninja Turtles – Season 5 (August 7, 2007) 
3-disc set containing episodes 3–20 from season 5.
Note: This release skips over episode 2, "Once Upon a Time Machine", and the two-part season finale, "Planet of the Turtleoids". These were later released with season 10.
Teenage Mutant Ninja Turtles – Season 6 (April 8, 2008) 
2-disc set containing all 16 episodes from season 6.
Teenage Mutant Ninja Turtles – Season 7 Part 1: The Leonardo Slice (May 12, 2009) 
Single disc containing episodes 1–6 from the "Vacation in Europe" sideseason, packaged with a free Leonardo action figure.
Teenage Mutant Ninja Turtles – Season 7 Part 2: The Michelangelo Slice (May 12, 2009) 
Single disc containing episodes 7–13 from the "Vacation in Europe" sideseason, packaged with a free Michelangelo action figure.
Teenage Mutant Ninja Turtles – Season 7 Part 3: The Donatello Slice (May 12, 2009) 
Single disc containing episodes 1–7 from season 7, packaged with a free Donatello action figure.
Teenage Mutant Ninja Turtles – Season 7 Part 4: The Raphael Slice (May 12, 2009) 
Single disc containing episodes 8–14 from season 7, packaged with a free Raphael action figure.
Teenage Mutant Ninja Turtles – The Complete Season 8 (September 1, 2009) 
Single disc containing all 8 episodes from season 8.
Teenage Mutant Ninja Turtles – The Complete Season 7 Set (November 3, 2009) 
4-disc set containing all 13 episodes from the "Vacation" sideseason, plus all 14 episodes from season 7.
Teenage Mutant Ninja Turtles – The Complete Season 9 (August 16, 2011) 
Single disc containing all 8 episodes from season 9.
Teenage Mutant Ninja Turtles – The Complete Season 10 (August 14, 2012) 
Single disc containing all 8 episodes from season 10, plus 3 episodes held over from season 5.
Teenage Mutant Ninja Turtles – The Complete Classic Series Collection (November 13, 2012; June 12, 2018 re-release) 
23-disc set including all 193 episodes from seasons 1–10, including the "Vacation" sideseason, the 2012 release is packaged in a collectable plastic box molded to resemble to the Turtle Van.
Teenage Mutant Ninja Turtles – The Complete Season 3 (July 23, 2013) 
4-disc set containing all 47 episodes from season 3.
Note: This release is just a re-packaged volumes 3–6 as Season 3.
Teenage Mutant Ninja Turtles – Cowabunga Classics (July 29, 2014) 
Single disc containing 10 fan-favorite episodes as chosen by a poll on TV.com.
Teenage Mutant Ninja Turtles – Volume 5 & 6 (October 20, 2015)
Note: 2-Disc set containing episodes 25-48 from season 3.
Teenage Mutant Ninja Turtles – Volume 1 & 2 (April 21, 2016)
2-Disc set containing all 18 episodes from season 1 & 2.
Teenage Mutant Ninja Turtles – Volume 3 & 4 (April 21, 2016)
2-Disc set containing episodes 1-24 from season 3.
Teenage Mutant Ninja Turtles – Seasons 5 & 6 (April 21, 2016)
4-Disc set containing all 34 episodes from seasons 5 & 6.
Teenage Mutant Ninja Turtles – Seasons 7 & 8 (April 21, 2016)
5-Disc set containing all 35 episodes from seasons 7 & 8.
Teenage Mutant Ninja Turtles – Seasons 9 & 10 (April 21, 2016)
2-Disc set containing all 18 episodes from seasons 9 & 10.

Region 2

United Kingdom
Teenage Mutant Ninja Turtles – The Original TV Series: 25th Anniversary Collector's Edition (May 25, 2009) 
3-disc set containing all 18 episodes from seasons 1 and 2, plus 4 bonus episodes from season 10.
Teenage Mutant Ninja Turtles – 3 'Turtally' Awesome Episodes from the Original TV Series (May 25, 2009) 
Single disc containing episodes 1–3 from season 1.
Teenage Mutant Ninja Turtles – The Best of Leonardo (May 19, 2014) 
Single disc containing 3 episodes.
Teenage Mutant Ninja Turtles – The Best of Michelangelo (May 19, 2014) 
Single disc containing 3 episodes.
Teenage Mutant Ninja Turtles – The Best of Donatello (May 19, 2014) 
Single disc containing 3 episodes.
Teenage Mutant Ninja Turtles – The Best of Raphael (May 19, 2014) 
Single disc containing 3 episodes.
Teenage Mutant Ninja Turtles – Cowabunga Classics (September 22, 2014) 
Single disc containing 10 fan-favorite episodes as chosen by a poll on TV.com.

Germany
Teenage Mutant Hero Turtles – DVD Collection (July 26, 2007) 
5-disc set containing all 24 episodes from seasons 8, 9 and 10.
Note: This is the only German release of the series to date that does not contain the English audio track.
Teenage Mutant Ninja Turtles – Box 1 (March 12, 2009) 
5-disc set containing all 5 episodes from season 1, all 13 episodes from season 2, plus episodes 1–7 from season 3.
Teenage Mutant Ninja Turtles – Box 2 (May 3, 2010) 
5-disc set containing episodes 8–32 from season 3.
Teenage Mutant Ninja Turtles – Box 3 (July 12, 2010) 
6-disc set containing episodes 33–47 from season 3, episodes 1–2 from season 4, plus all 13 episodes from the "Vacation" sideseason.
Teenage Mutant Ninja Turtles – Box 4 (October 17, 2011) 
6-disc set containing episodes 3–32 from season 4.
Teenage Mutant Ninja Turtles – Box 5 (December 5, 2011) 
6-disc set containing episodes 33–39 from season 4, plus all 22 episodes from season 5 and the first episode from season 6.
Teenage Mutant Ninja Turtles – Box 6 (February 20, 2012) 
6-disc set containing episodes 2–16 from season 6 and all of the regular season 7.
Teenage Mutant Ninja Turtles – Gesamtedition (November 29, 2013) 
22-disc set containing all 169 episodes from seasons 1–7, including the "Vacation" sideseason.

Region 4 (Australia)
Note: Some of these weblinks give inaccurate information.
Teenage Mutant Ninja Turtles – Volume 1 (March 11, 2009) 
Single disc containing all 5 episodes from season 1, plus 4 bonus episodes from season 10.
Teenage Mutant Ninja Turtles – Volume 2 (March 11, 2009) 
Single disc containing all 13 episodes from season 2.
Teenage Mutant Ninja Turtles – Volume 3 (March 11, 2009) 
Single disc containing episodes 1–12 from season 3.
Teenage Mutant Ninja Turtles – Volume 4 (June 3, 2009) 
Single disc containing episodes 13–24 from season 3.
Teenage Mutant Ninja Turtles – Volume 5 (June 3, 2009) 
Single disc containing episodes 25–36 from season 3.
Teenage Mutant Ninja Turtles – Volume 6 (June 3, 2009) 
Single disc containing episodes 37–47 from season 3, plus episode 1 from season 4.
Teenage Mutant Ninja Turtles – Volume 7 (September 9, 2009) 
Single disc containing episodes 2–14 from season 4.
Teenage Mutant Ninja Turtles – Volume 8 (September 9, 2009) 
Single disc containing episodes 15–27 from season 4.
Teenage Mutant Ninja Turtles – Volume 9 (September 9, 2009) 
Single disc containing episodes 28–40 from season 4.

VHS release

Region 1 (United States of America and Canada)
Teenage Mutant Ninja Turtles: Convicts from Dimension X (July 18, 1995)

Region 2

(United Kingdom)
TBA

(Germany)
TBA

Region 4 (Australia & New Zealand)
TBA

See also
List of Teenage Mutant Ninja Turtles (2003) episodes
List of Teenage Mutant Ninja Turtles (2012) episodes

References

Episodes
Teenage Mutant Ninja Turtles, 1987
Teenage Mutant Ninja Turtles, 1987
1987